Milla is a plant genus in the family Asparagaceae.

Milla may also refer to:

Units of measurement
 Milla (unit), the Spanish mile of about

People
Given name
 Milla Baldo-Ceolin (1924–2011), Italian particle physicist
 Milla Clementsdotter (1812–1892), Swedish Southern Sami who is remembered for guiding Lars Levi Laestadius in questions of Christian faith
 Milla Davenport (1871–1936), actress
 Milla Jovovich (born 1975), performer
 Milla Saari (born 1975), Finnish cross-country skier
 Milla Viljamaa (born 1980), Finnish musician and composer

Surname
 Cristian Milla (born 1984), Argentine footballer
 Jimmy Lemi Milla (1948–2011), Sudanese politician
 José Justo Milla (1794–1838), Honduran military leader
 Luis Milla (born 1966), Spanish footballer
 Pasquale Di Milla (1869–1940), Italian priest
 Roger Milla (born 1952), Cameroonian footballer

Places
 Milla, Burkina Faso
 Milla, Illinois
 Millas, France

Fictional characters
 Milla Donovan, a character in the Marvel comic book series Daredevil
 Milla Basset, a character in the video game Freedom Planet
 Milla, a character in the Seventh Tower book series
 Milla Maxwell, a character in the video game Tales of Xillia
 Milla Vodello, a character in the video game Psychonauts

Other uses
Millet (Ottoman Empire), an Arabic word for nation

See also
 Camilla